Kitty Burns Florey is the author of eleven novels and two nonfiction books. She lives in Amherst, Massachusetts.

Bibliography 
Amity Street (2017), White River Press
The Quest for Inez: Two Ways to Find a Grandmother (2015), Genealogy House
The Writing Master (2011), White River Press
Script and Scribble: The Rise and Fall of Handwriting (2009), Melville House Publishing
The Sleep Specialist (2007), Raven's Eye Publishing
Sister Bernadette's Barking Dog (2006), Melville House Publishing
Solos (2004), Berkley Books
Souvenir of Cold Springs (2001), Counterpoint Press, Berkley Books
Five Questions (2001), Time Warner Books
Vigil for a Stranger (1994)
Duet (1998)
Real Life (1986)
The Garden Path (1983)
Chez Cordelia (1980)
Family Matters (1979)

References

External links
 kitty burns florey
 "The sentences of Sarah Palin, diagrammed" on Slate
 "5 Questions with Kitty Burns Florey" on Editrix

Living people
American women writers
1943 births
21st-century American women